August Mark Petzke (23 August 1896 – 26 May 1967) was an Australian rules footballer who played with Richmond in the Victorian Football League (VFL).

Notes

External links 

1896 births
1967 deaths
Australian rules footballers from Victoria (Australia)
Richmond Football Club players
Yarraville Football Club players